The Europa Hut (German: Europahütte) is a mountain hut located in the Mattertal above Randa in the Mischabel range at 2,265 m, owned by the Swiss Alpine Club. It lies on the Grächen-Zermatt high trail, called Europaweg (also part of the Monte Rosa Tour). From the hut a trail leads to the Dom Hut, on the normal route to the Dom.

The Europaweg is badly affected by unstable terrain; the entire path is prone to rockfalls and sections are sometimes closed. The section between the Europahütte and Zermatt reopened on 4 July 2010 with the construction of a 230-metre suspension bridge over the Grabengufer ravine, but this has since been closed due to the risk of falling rocks. A new bridge has now replaced the old one and is open to the public. The new Charles Kuonen Bridge is the second-longest hanging pedestrian bridge in the world. The bridge is located around 500 metres southwest of the hut.

References

External links 
Official website
Europa Hut on the SAC website

Mountain huts in Switzerland
Mountain huts in the Alps